Iain Todd (1924-2017) was a Scottish rugby union player. He was the 109th President of the Scottish Rugby Union.

Rugby Union career

Amateur career

Born in Clouston Street, Glasgow, Todd went to Hillhead High School with his brother, David Todd. He played rugby for the school. On leaving school Todd went to the University of Glasgow to study medicine.

While he was at Glasgow University he played for Glasgow University rugby union side.

After leaving the university, Todd then played for Hillhead HSFP.

International career

While in Burma - now Myanmar - with the Royal Army Medical Corps he played for a Burma XV against the British Army.

Referee career

He became Hillhead RFC 1st XV's touch judge. He often packed his Hillhead strip in his linesman kit bag - unbeknownst to his wife - in case the 'team was ever short'.

Administrative career

He served on the Glasgow District committee from the mid 1970s.

He was elected to the SRU general committee in 1980.

Todd became the 109th President of the Scottish Rugby Union. He served the standard one year from 1995 to 1996.

Military career

Todd left Hillhead High School in 1942. He joined the Home Guard for the rest of the Second World War while studying at university. He then joined the Royal Army Medical Corps in 1948 and went to Myanmar as part of the Burma mission.

Medical career

He went to Glasgow University to study medicine in 1942. After returning from Myanmar he completed his residency at the Western Infirmary. He joined a General Practice in Govan with the former swimmer Dr Mirrlees Chassels.

Other interests

His grandfather had a farm in Campeltown, Kintyre and he developed a love of Argyll. In particular he loved sailing. So much so that he joined the Loch Lomond Sailing Club; that bit closer to Glasgow than Campeltown. He became a long-time member and knew the loch intimately.

Tributes

John Beattie recalled a time when Todd helped him through an injury:
It was my career-ending ligament injury. Iain’s daughter lived round the corner from our top-floor flat in Broomhill and Iain was very generous in wanting to help. I had a pin through my knee and kept yelping as he pushed me up the stairs grunting: ‘Just a few more steps…’ he was a truly lovely man and a huge part of my early life. Old fashioned and honest.
Alan Hosie, former international referee and one time SRU President:
Iain was immensely popular within rugby, and never more so than when he was international tickets allocation secretary and convener; then, he was everybody’s friend!

References

1924 births
2017 deaths
Scottish rugby union players
Presidents of the Scottish Rugby Union
Hillhead RFC players
Rugby union players from Glasgow
British Army personnel of World War II
British Home Guard soldiers
Royal Army Medical Corps soldiers